ItsJustSomeRandomGuy is the alias of Michael Agrusso, an American voice acting teacher, writer, and performer working and living in Los Angeles, California. The channel is the source of the YouTube video parody series "Hi, I'm a Marvel...and I'm a DC", which spoofs Apple's Get a Mac television commercials, known for their opening lines, "Hello, I'm a Mac..." "...And I'm a PC."

Background 
In late February/early March 2007, Agrusso read the Internet news that the films based on the DC Comics characters The Flash and Wonder Woman both lost their directors due to creative differences with Warner Brothers on the same day. In contrast, several future films based on Marvel Comics characters were in production. He later saw a "Get a Mac" commercial, which inspired him to parody the contrasting levels of success between Marvel and DC film productions.

Marvel/DC parodies 
Agrusso first wrote the scripts for four videos, using two characters, Spider-Man (Marvel) and Superman (DC), as their companies' representatives. After posting two videos in March 2007, Agrusso posted six more videos in the subsequent months.

In the summer of 2008, five superhero movie blockbusters opened: Iron Man, The Incredible Hulk, Hancock, Hellboy II: The Golden Army, and The Dark Knight. In response, Agrusso created a second "Hi, I'm a Marvel" series, this time with Iron Man (Marvel), the Hulk (Marvel), Batman (DC) and Hellboy (Dark Horse) instead of Spider-Man and Superman.  The series spanned the summer as the new superhero movies opened.

In February 2009, Agrusso was again hired by the New York Comic Con organization to make promotional videos for their event.

Reception and popularity 
As of November 25, 2012, 165,528 YouTube users were subscribed to the channel and its videos had been viewed more than 79 million times; the channel's first video has been viewed over 4.8 million times.  An official press release by New York Comic Con via Comic Book Resources called Agrusso "a genuine Internet superstar."  In July 2008, q4music.com ranked one of the channel's videos as one of the top ten YouTube videos of the month.

The channel primarily discusses comic book films from the two major comic book companies (Marvel and DC) using humor. Agrusso writes, performs, and shoots his videos at home.

In 2012, Agrusso voiced Superman in an episode of the popular web series, Death Battle, by ScrewAttack, and also helped promote the video with his own skits. It was the most highly requested episode in which Superman would fight Goku from Dragon Ball Z, and has received 38 million views to this day. Agrusso reprised his role for a second episode in 2015.

Music 

Agrusso uses GarageBand program on his computer to create much of the background music for his videos. He has composed a few pieces of music:

See also 
List of YouTube celebrities

References

External links 

ItsJustSomeRandomStore

American comedy web series
Episode lists with row deviations
Episode list using the default LineColor
Living people
Websites about comics
Year of birth missing (living people)
Place of birth missing (living people)
YouTube channels launched in 2007
Comedy YouTubers
Commentary YouTubers
Writers from Los Angeles
Entertainers from California